The 8th FINA World Junior Swimming Championships was held from 30 August to 4 September 2022 at the Videna Aquatic Center in Lima, Peru. It was open to competition for girls ages 14 to 17 years old and boys ages 15 to 18 years old at the end of the 2022 calendar year. All events were conducted in a 50-metre (long course) pool.

Originally the competition was planned for 24–29 August 2021, however the COVID-19 pandemic resulted in its postponement to 24–29 August 2022. In April 2022, FINA announced a change of dates as well as a change host from Kazan, Russia to Lima, Peru due to the 2022 Russia invasion of Ukraine. The same month, FINA announced athletes and officials from Belarus and Russia were banned from the Championships.

Qualification
Various qualification systems were implemented internationally, one of which used by Swimming New Zealand and Swimming South Africa was the selection of swimmers to compete at the 8th World Junior Swimming Championships from pre-defined national-level competitions based on the swimmers's times and overall national rank of their performances across the defined competitions, only the top two were eligible per individual event. Another selection procedure, put forward by Swim Ireland before the location and dates of the Championships were changed and retained after the change, was based on swimmers achieving pre-defined consideration times at a national championships or the 2022 European Junior Championships and overall national rank. Prior to the change of dates and location in 2022, British Swimming also announced a selection procedure, basing selection on swimmer performances at a single selection meet, the 2022 British Swimming Championships.

Schedule
A total of 42 events were competed over six days, starting on 30 August and concluding on 4 September.

Medal summary

Medal table

Results

Men's events

 Swimmers who participated in the heats only and received medals.

Women's events

 Swimmers who participated in the heats only and received medals.

Mixed events

 Swimmers who participated in the heats only and received medals.

Championships records set
The following Championships records were set during the course of competition.

Participating countries
Swimmers from the following countries participated at the Championships.

Change of dates and location

Postponement due to the COVID-19 pandemic
In March 2021, British Swimming announced that the impacts of the COVID-19 pandemic combined with other factors, including no publicly revealed dates nor venue for the 8th World Junior Swimming Championships, had changed how they were conducting their selection trials for the 2020 Summer Olympics. By the end of the month, Swimming Australia had withdrawn its swimmers for the championships due to concerns about transmission of COVID-19 to its athletes. The following month Swimming Canada pulled out of the competition as well, in part due to concerns about the health and safety of its swimmers and in part due to difficulties fairly running qualification events. Two months later, in June, FINA postponed the championships to August 2022 in the pursuit of safer travel conditions and less COVID-19 related risks for participating athletes. Frustration was vocalized by USA Swimming following the postponement of the championships, and youth who would have competed at the championships had they been held in 2021 instead competed at the 2021 FINA Swimming World Cup.

Path to cancelation
The 8th World Junior Swimming Championships was originally scheduled to take place at the Palace of Water Sports in Kazan, Russia in 2021, and in June 2021 it was postponed to 24–29 August 2022 due to the COVID-19 pandemic. This followed the implementation of a ban by the Court of Arbitration for Sport spanning 17 December 2020 to 16 December 2022 not allowing Russians to compete at World Championships with their country name, flag, or anthem, meaning Russian youth competing at this Championships would be required to compete without their country name, flag, and anthem in their own country.

On 25 February 2022, elevated political tensions between Russia and Ukraine resulted in FINA cancelling water polo, artistic swimming and diving events that had been scheduled to take place in Russia for March and April 2022, in regards to other competitions scheduled to take place in Russia for the 2022 year, FINA stated, "Other FINA events that are scheduled in Russia for later in the year are under close review, with FINA monitoring events in Ukraine very carefully."

On 26 February 2022, nine members of various Nordic Swimming Federations published a joint statement announcing their withdrawal from the Championships if it is hosted in Russia as a form of protest in opposition to the 2022 Russian invasion of Ukraine. The following national swimming federation presidents signed the statement: Danish Swimming Union (Denmark), Estonian Swimming Federation (Estonia), Faroe Islands Swimming Association (Faroe Islands), Finnish Swimming Federation (Finland), Icelandic Swimming Association (Iceland), Latvian Swimming Federation (Latvia), Lithuanian Swimming Federation (Lithuania), Norwegian Swimming Federation (Norway), and Swedish Swimming Federation (Sweden).

On 27 February 2022, FINA published an official statement canceling the 8th FINA World Junior Swimming Championships. FINA was one of a number of sporting organizations, which also included Formula One and the International Ski Federation, to boycott holding competitions in Russia by canceling an event originally scheduled to be held in the county.

Path to reinstatement
On 23 March 2022, FINA announced its intent to reinstate the 8th World Junior Swimming Championships with a change host venue and possibly dates. The same day, FINA announced the Russian Swimming Federation had earlier withdrawn its athletes from FINA events for the remainder of the 2022 calendar year, meaning they would not send athletes to the Championships.

On 14 April 2022, FINA announced the reinstatement of the Championships with Lima, Peru serving as the new host of the event, Videna Aquatic Center serving as the new venue, and a change of dates to 30 August through 4 September 2022.

On 21 April 2022, FINA published a statement instituting a ban on all athletes and officials from Russia and Belarus for the Championships, and all remaining FINA events in 2022.

See also
 List of swimming competitions
 FINA World Junior Swimming Championships
 2022 in sports

References

External links
 Competition website
 Results
 Results book

FINA World Junior Swimming Championships
2022 in swimming
2022 in Peruvian sport
International aquatics competitions hosted by Peru
Swimming competitions in Peru
Sports competitions in Lima
2020s in Lima
FINA
FINA
Sports events affected by the 2022 Russian invasion of Ukraine